Wings of Glory is a World War I combat flight simulator video game for DOS, developed by Origin Systems and published by Electronic Arts in 1995. The game uses Origin's RealSpace engine, which was first used in their earlier flight simulator Strike Commander.

Gameplay
The player begins the game as an American novice newly arrived in England who must take part in numerous missions, which involve taking off, completing certain objectives, then returning to base. The various planes that can be piloted are realistic for the time period; the starting plane is a lowly Sopwith Pup, with more advanced planes becoming available as the game progresses. Each plane has its own machine gun and some are able to drop bombs. The gameplay is primarily in first-person with an option to switch to third-person.

In addition to the main campaign there is a Gauntlet mode where the objective is to survive for as long as possible against a constant wave of enemies. There is also a level designer where the player can create their own missions.

Reception
PC Gamer gave it a score of 92%, saying, "Wings of Glory isn't just the most realistic-feeling World War I flight sim on the market, it's also a carefully crafted homage to the great aerial epics of the '20s and '30s" and "Quibbles aside, Origin has given us another superb product in Wings of Glory". Computer Gaming World gave it a score of 90%, noting that a post-release patch fixed a lot of the initial complaints. In general, the game was praised for its visuals, audio and storytelling, with criticisms falling on the sluggish controls and difficulty of flying (much of which was addressed in a patch).

References

External links
Wings of Glory at MobyGames

1995 video games
Combat flight simulators
World War I flight simulation video games
DOS games
DOS-only games
Electronic Arts games
Origin Systems games
World War I video games
Video games produced by Warren Spector
Video games developed in the United States